Dmitri Gromov (born 3 December 1967) is a former competitive figure skater for the Soviet Union. He placed fourth at the 1989 European Championships. After retiring from competition, he performed in ice shows.

Competitive highlights

References 

Soviet male single skaters
Living people
1967 births
Figure skaters from Saint Petersburg